Jake Hunter, known in Japan as , is a mystery adventure game series originally developed and published by Data East in 1987. The property would later transfer to WorkJam, and then to Arc System Works.

Despite its popularity in Japan, the first of its games to receive an English language release was Tantei Jingūji Saburō DS: Inishie no Kioku, retitled and released in North America on June 11, 2008 by Aksys Games in truncated form as Jake Hunter: Detective Chronicles. The game was re-released on May 26, 2009 as Jake Hunter Detective Story: Memories of the Past, containing the originally localised three cases with new translations, plus three further cases, and a large number of unlockables including comics. No further releases would be announced until July 1, 2017, when Aksys Games revealed they would be bringing over Tantei Jingūji Saburō: Ghost of the Dusk in 2018. A prequel game, given the branding Alternate Jake Hunter internationally, was localised internally and released in 2019 with original character names and settings preserved.

History
According to Enterbrain's Famitsu, the Tantei Jingūji Saburō franchise had sold over 2,220,000 units at the time of its twentieth anniversary, making it one of the longest running and best-selling Japanese adventure game series in history. There are nineteen main series entries, complemented by a 25-game mobile sub-series and various examples of tie-in media. A persistent series tradition has been to use titles from songs and albums as names for installments, with most frequent reference made to the works of Kenji Sawada.

Family Computer
The first game of the series, was released in 1987 by Data East for the Family Computer Disk System. Following in the style of Yuji Horii's popular Famicom adventure games, the "command selection" style games featured advanced graphics, sound effects, and distinct hardboiled scenarios to set themselves apart from contemporaries. The series employed a number of advanced game mechanics, developing techniques which would later find popularity in the industry at large. Time played an important role in the first game, with each command selected by the player causing a certain amount of in-game time to elapse; failure to solve the mystery during the allotted time period resulting in a bad ending. This time system would later be revived in the series' 7th installment. The scenario for the series' 3rd and 4th installments was written by a fledgling Kazushige Nojima, who added segments following the secondary lead which alternated on a predetermined basis.

Fifth generation consoles
Production was halted after the 4th installment, but would be revived internally when Data East took on series fan Tatsuya Saito. Saito would become scenario writer for the 5th game in the series, directed by Eiichi Nishiyama, imminent heir to the role of series producer, and released on the PlayStation and Sega Saturn in 1996. This fifth entry would see several developments on the original games made possible by the use of the CD-ROM: an overhaul of the series' graphics and sound, including an opening movie featuring an animated prelude and voice acting for the first time; a "zapping" system which allowed different branches of the story to be played by way of alternating characters; 3D-rendered mini games; and the inaugural installment of a sub-series known in Japan as the Mystery Casebook games (Jake Hunter Unleashed in English releases), featuring super-deformed caricatures of the main trio encountering small-scale mysteries involving extra challenging gameplay, which would be included alongside mainline games.

Most of these features would become recurrent in the series, with the 6th installment, written by Hirotaka Inaba, replacing the previous game's stylised character design with a painted realist style produced by original character designer Katsuya Terada, and adding a new "password" mechanic, involving hidden codes in the main game which could be used to unlock bonus content. Bearing the newly christened series subtitle "Detective Adventure Game", both this game and the next, released exclusively for PlayStation, would feature opening movies directed by Shimako Satō.

Sixth generation consoles
In 1999, a financially troubled Data East licensed out the series to WorkJam, to which Nishiyama's "Team Jingūji" would transfer when Data East went bankrupt in 2003. The transition between studios marked a shift in game design, storytelling becoming once more linear and perspective shifts scripted, setting the formula for later games in the series. With previous scenario writers unavailable, writing duties for the series' eighth installment, developed for PlayStation 2 in 2002, fell to WorkJam founder Yutaka Kaminaga. The resultant game featured a number of peripheral references to the contemporary Grasshopper Manufacture game The Silver Case.

The series continued at WorkJam with a further game for the PS2 and reimaginings of the Famicom games released as the inauguration of a line of mobile phone applications. The final game of the generation, co-developed by Marvelous Interactive for the Game Boy Advance, marked the series debut on handheld platforms.

Seventh generation consoles
Beginning with a special 20th anniversary release for the Nintendo DS, WorkJam would work with Arc System Works in development of console games, now released exclusively on handheld platforms, predominantly in the form of the Tantei Jingūji Saburō Detective Story compilation line, with the addition of a PlayStation Portable release similar in form to earlier PlayStation installments. WorkJam licensed a series of PlayStation Game Archives releases of the original Data East games to Expris, and continued their mobile game line, featuring contributions from writers such as Kazutaka Kodaka, to a total of twenty-four releases before it was retired.

Eighth-generation consoles
In 2011, WorkJam began to wind down production, with full responsibilities for the ongoing development of a special 25th-anniversary game for the Nintendo 3DS falling to Arc System Works. Several WorkJam staff, including Nishiyama and planner/scenario writer Mitsue Kaneko, would form a new studio, Orange, while rights to various company properties including the Tantei Jingūji Saburō series passed to Expris. For the next five years the series would remain largely dormant, aside from Game Archives rereleases of WorkJam's two PS2 games from Expris, and a cameo by the title character in Inuwashi Urabure Tantei to Ojou-sama Keiji no Ikebukuro Jiken Fairu, a mobile game developed by Orange and scored by longtime series composer Seiichi Hamada.

In 2017, Arc System Works announced that plans for a 30th-anniversary revival had led to its obtaining of exclusive rights to Expris' WorkJam-inherited properties at the end of the previous year. Following this, the company worked with Orange and Neilo to publish several titles for handheld and home consoles, while exploring new avenues for PC delivery and reviving the mobile line for smart devices.

Characters
The main character of the series is Jake Hunter (known in Japan as ), a thirty-something (29 for the first five installments) private investigator who operates a detective agency in the Tripudio district of the fictional American city of Aspicio (Kabukichō, Shinjuku in the Japanese original). He was born the third son of a wealthy business enterprise owner, but chose to travel to New York City during his youth to work as an assistant detective. He is a heavy smoker, and often assembles his thoughts with the help of a Marlboro cigarette. According to his in-game profile, his favorite alcoholic beverage is cognac, and he drives a green Mini Cooper.

Hunter is persistently accompanied in his investigations by Yulia Marks (known in Japan as ), his polyglot assistant, and often collaborates with his old friend Scott "King" Kingsley (known in Japan as ), a middle-aged inspector with the city police.

Voice acting
Voice acting was first used in certain game scenes in the 5th installment, and has been implemented in most subsequent releases, excluding those released for mobile, GBA and DS. Jingūji has been voiced by Yukimasa Kishino, Akio Ōtsuka, Jūrōta Kosugi, and Kaoru Katō; Yōko by Tsumugi Ōsawa, Yōko Saitō, Fumiko Orikasa, Kazue Nakamoto, Seiko Yoshida, and Mamiko Noto; and Sanzō by Fumihiko Tachiki, Kōji Ishii, Masaaki Tsukada, and Naomi Otome.

List of media

Mobile series
The mobile games began development under WorkJam for flip phones in 2003. The first four games were remakes of the original Famicom games, featuring (often significant) reworking of their stories. Following Arc System Works' acquisition of the series in 2017, the original games were collected in a smartphone app, and the line relaunched with a new series beginning in 2019.

Other media
The series has been accompanied by a plethora of tie-in books, the first of which, a choose-your-own-adventure style gamebook for young adults, was released in 1988. After the series revival at Data East, Tatsuya Saito would pen a prequel novel documenting the first meeting between Jingūji and Kumano. A further novel would be published in 2000, followed by a novelisation of the eighth game. Another prequel, telling a story set during Jingūji's schooldays, was published by Dengeki Bunko in 2004, followed by a brief sequence of releases at Sesame Books, ending in 2007.

Manga adaptations of the third and sixth games were previously made available online, and several game guides were published prior to the series' shift toward handheld platforms.

Several soundtrack CDs have also been released, featuring a range of music from across the series composed by series stalwart Seiichi Hamada and others. A Drama CD featuring three short vignettes was included with early copies of the sixth game.

The first four games in the series were released on the Wii's Virtual Console exclusively in Japan.

See also
Katsuya Terada (original character designer and illustrator throughout the series)
Portopia Renzoku Satsujin Jiken (a contemporary mystery-adventure game series)

References

External links
 WorkJam
 Innocent Black
 KIND OF BLUE
 Mobile series
 Marvelous Entertainment
 Shiroi Kage no Shōjo
 Arc System Works
 Inishie no Kioku
 Kienai Kokoro
 Fuserareta Shinjitsu
 Hai to Daiyamondo
 Akai Chō
 Fukushū no Rondo
 Oldies
 GHOST OF THE DUSK
 Prism of Eyes
 Daedalus
 Orange
 New Order

1987 video games
Adventure games
Arc System Works franchises
Data East video games
Detective video games
Famicom Disk System games
Game Boy Advance games
Japan-exclusive video games
Nintendo 3DS games
Nintendo DS games
Nintendo Entertainment System games
Nintendo Switch games
PlayStation (console) games
PlayStation 2 games
PlayStation 4 games
PlayStation Portable games
Sega Saturn games
Video game franchises
Video games developed in Japan
Virtual Console games